Rubén Antonio González Medina, C.M.F. (born February 9, 1949) is a Puerto Rican born American prelate of the Catholic Church. He has been serving as bishop of the Diocese of Ponce in Puerto Rico since 2016.  He previously served as bishop of the Diocese of Caguas in Puerto Rico from 2000 to 2015.

Biography

Early life
Rubén González was born in Santurce, Puerto Rico, on February 9, 1949. In 1966, at 17 years of age, he was admitted to the Claretian novitiate in Salvatierra, Álava, Spain, and professed temporary religious vows in 1967. He then studied, from 1969 to 1973, philosophy and the first year of theology in Colmenar Viejo, Community of Madrid. In 1972, González professed his perpetual vows as a member of the congregation, and then completed his studies in the diocesan seminary of Paso Ancho, Costa Rica.

Priesthood
González was ordained a deacon in Costa Rica on September 8, 1974.  He received his ordination as a priest of the Claretian Order from Bishop Ignacio Nazareno Trejos Picado in Costa Rica on February 9, 1975. González was elected as the local superior of the Claretian Missionaries of the Antilles in 1999.

Bishop of Caguas

González was appointed Bishop of the Diocese of Caguas by Pope John Paul II on December 12, 2000, taking over from the apostolic administrator, BishopÁlvaro Corrada del Río, S.J..  González was consecrated by Cardinal Luis Aponte Martínez on February 4, 2001.

Bishop of Ponce
On December 22, 2015, González was appointed by Pope Francis as bishop of the Diocese of Ponce; he was installed on January 31, 2016.

See also

 Catholic Church hierarchy
 Catholic Church in the United States
 Historical list of the Catholic bishops of Puerto Rico
 Historical list of the Catholic bishops of the United States
 List of Catholic bishops of the United States
 Lists of patriarchs, archbishops, and bishops

References

External links

 Roman Catholic Diocese of Ponce (Official Site in Spanish)

Episcopal succession

1949 births
Living people
People from Santurce, Puerto Rico
Claretian bishops
21st-century Roman Catholic bishops in Puerto Rico
Bishops appointed by Pope John Paul II
Roman Catholic bishops of Caguas
Roman Catholic bishops of Ponce